Richard Alexander Richardson (1 June 1934 – 15 July 1999) was a heavyweight boxer from the Maesglas area of Newport, Monmouthshire, Wales. He held the European heavyweight title from March 1960 to June 1962. In all, he won 31 of his 47 professional bouts, losing 14, with two drawn. He was one of a quartet of British heavyweights in the 1950s and early 1960s, along with Henry Cooper, Joe Erskine and Brian London, who held out the possibility of a challenging for a heavyweight world champion.

Richardson defeated a number of top heavyweights in his career, including; Karl Mildenberger, Bob Baker, Brian London and Hans Kalbfell.

Career
He was born Richard Alexander Richardson but was known as Dick. He had a few amateur bouts before being called up for his national service in 1953. He served in the Royal Army Service Corps where he became boxing champion. However he was beaten in the inter-services boxing championships by Brian London, later to become British heavyweight boxing champion, and fighting under his real name of Harper. He turned professional in 1954, being managed by Wally Lesley and trained by Johnny Lewis at a gym in Blackfriars, London. In September 1954, he lost his first professional bout on points against Henry Cooper's twin brother, George, fighting under the ring name of Jim Cooper. He avenged this defeat in March 1955 with a technical knockout in the second round.

Rising up 
Richardson began to build up an impressive list of victories, many of them inside the distance. In May 1956 he fought fellow Welsh heavyweight, Joe Erskine, in the Maindy Stadium, Cardiff, in front of 35,000 fans. Despite knocking Erskine down in round five, Richardson lost on points. Richardson continued to look for higher-class opponents and in October 1956, he fought the ex-world champion Ezzard Charles in a fight that became a farce when the American was disqualified in round two for persistent holding. He next fought the world-class Cuban, Nino Valdes in December 1956, but was forced to retire in the eighth round.

Richardson's first title fight was for the Commonwealth (British Empire) Heavyweight Title against the holder, the Jamaican, Joe Bygraves, in Cardiff in May 1957. The fight, over fifteen rounds was a draw and Bygraves retained his title.

In October 1957, Richardson, was easily out-pointed in a bout against the future world light-heavyweight champion, Willie Pastrano. His career appeared to be faltering when he was beaten by Henry Cooper in September 1958, on a technical knockout in the fifth round, and also lost to Joe Erskine on points in June 1959.

European title
However, in March 1960, he was matched against the German boxer Hans Kalbfell, for the vacant European heavyweight title. He had previously beaten Kalbfell in four rounds, in Porthcawl, and he won this bout, held in Dortmund, Germany, by a technical knockout in the thirteenth round. The defeat of Kalbfell provoked a riot amongst the German fans, and Richardson needed a police escort to reach his dressing room.

Richardson defended his European title in August 1960, against Brian London, in Porthcawl, winning by a technical knockout in the eighth round. This result provoked a brawl, when London's father and brother, with Richardson's brothers coming in to defend as the Londons invaded the ring to protest that Richardson had used his head to open a cut on his opponent.

Richardson also won a return bout against Hans Kalbfell in Dortmund in February 1961, gaining a points decision.

Richardson won the next defence of his title, in February 1962, against the German, Karl Mildenberger, by an astonishing first-round knockout. The bout was held in Dortmund. Mildenberger would fight Muhammad Ali for the world title several years later.

Richardson's fourth defence of his title was in June 1962, against the hard-punching Swede, Ingemar Johansson. Johansson had been world heavyweight champion after beating Floyd Patterson, but had subsequently lost the title to Patterson in June 1960. The bout was held in Gothenburg, Sweden in front of 50,000 spectators, and Richardson was knocked out in the eighth round.

Richardson's last fight was in March 1963, when Henry Cooper defended his British and Commonwealth heavyweight titles against him at Wembley. Richardson was knocked out in the fifth round.

Retirement and death
Richardson retired at the relatively early age of 28, and ran a small chain of butcher's shops in Surrey. 
Dick Richardson, offered advice to Newport Heavyweight David Pearce.  Dick believed if David had signed with a promoter from London he would have become a World Champion. David would not leave his father due to his loyalty
He died from cancer on 15 July 1999, aged 65. He was married to Betty Richardson with one son, Gary and one daughter Lyn, from whom he has six grandchildren.

In his 47 professional bouts, he won 31 (24 on knock-outs), and lost 14 (4 on knock-outs). Two of his bouts were drawn.

Boxing quotes

Professional boxing record

|-
|align="center" colspan=8|31 Wins (24 knockouts, 6 decisions, 1 DQ), 14 Losses (4 knockouts, 7 decisions, 3 DQs), 2 Draws 
|-
| align="center" style="border-style: none none solid solid; background: #e3e3e3"|Result
| align="center" style="border-style: none none solid solid; background: #e3e3e3"|Record
| align="center" style="border-style: none none solid solid; background: #e3e3e3"|Opponent
| align="center" style="border-style: none none solid solid; background: #e3e3e3"|Type
| align="center" style="border-style: none none solid solid; background: #e3e3e3"|Round
| align="center" style="border-style: none none solid solid; background: #e3e3e3"|Date
| align="center" style="border-style: none none solid solid; background: #e3e3e3"|Location
| align="center" style="border-style: none none solid solid; background: #e3e3e3"|Notes
|-align=center
|Loss
|
|align=left| Henry Cooper
|KO
|5
|26 March 1963
|align=left| Empire Pool, Wembley, London
|align=left|
|-
|Loss
|
|align=left| Ingemar Johansson
|KO
|8
|17 June 1962
|align=left| Nya Ullevi, Gothenburg
|align=left|
|-
|Win
|
|align=left| Karl Mildenberger
|KO
|1
|24 February 1962
|align=left| Westfalenhallen, Dortmund
|align=left|
|-
|Loss
|
|align=left| Howard King
|PTS
|10
|5 September 1961
|align=left| Empire Pool, Wembley, London
|align=left|
|-
|Win
|
|align=left| Hans Kalbfell
|PTS
|15
|18 February 1961
|align=left| Westfalenhallen, Dortmund
|align=left|
|-
|Win
|
|align=left| Brian London
|TKO
|8
|29 August 1960
|align=left| Coney Beach Pleasure Park, Porthcawl
|align=left|
|-
|Loss
|
|align=left| Mike DeJohn
|DQ
|8
|27 July 1960
|align=left| Coney Beach Pleasure Park, Porthcawl
|align=left|
|-
|Win
|
|align=left| Hans Kalbfell
|TKO
|13
|27 March 1960
|align=left| Westfalenhallen, Dortmund
|align=left|
|-
|Loss
|
|align=left| Mike DeJohn
|PTS
|10
|1 December 1959
|align=left| Empire Pool, Wembley, London
|align=left|
|-
|Loss
|
|align=left| Joe Erskine
|PTS
|10
|24 June 1959
|align=left| Coney Beach Pleasure Park, Porthcawl
|align=left|
|-
|Win
|
|align=left| Bert Whitehurst
|PTS
|10
|10 March 1959
|align=left| Empire Pool, Wembley, London
|align=left|
|-
|Win
|
|align=left| Garvin Sawyer
|PTS
|10
|28 October 1958
|align=left| Harringay Arena, Harringay, London
|align=left|
|-
|Loss
|
|align=left| Henry Cooper
|TKO
|5
|3 September 1958
|align=left| Coney Beach Pleasure Park, Porthcawl
|align=left|
|-
|Win
|
|align=left| Bob Baker
|PTS
|10
|9 July 1958
|align=left| Coney Beach Pleasure Park, Porthcawl
|align=left|
|-
|Win
|
|align=left| Hans Friedrich
|KO
|4
|17 May 1958
|align=left| Newtown Pavilion, Newtown, Powys
|align=left|
|-
|Loss
|
|align=left| Cleveland Williams
|DQ
|4
|25 March 1958
|align=left| Empress Hall, Earl's Court, Kensington, London
|align=left|
|-
|Win
|
|align=left| Maurice Mols
|TKO
|6
|3 March 1958
|align=left| Carmarthen Market Hall, Carmarthen
|align=left|
|-
|Loss
|
|align=left| Bob Baker
|PTS
|10
|10 December 1957
|align=left| Harringay Arena, Harringay, London
|align=left|
|-
|Loss
|
|align=left| Willie Pastrano
|PTS
|10
|22 October 1957
|align=left| Harringay Arena, Harringay, London
|align=left|
|-
|Win
|
|align=left| Hans Kalbfell
|TKO
|4
|31 July 1957
|align=left| Coney Beach Pleasure Park, Porthcawl
|align=left|
|-
|Draw
|
|align=left| Joe Bygraves
|PTS
|15
|27 May 1957
|align=left| Maindy Stadium, Cardiff
|align=left|
|-
|Win
|
|align=left| Giannino Luise
|TKO
|5
|1 April 1957
|align=left| Nottingham Ice Stadium, Nottingham, Nottinghamshire
|align=left|
|-
|Loss
|
|align=left| Nino Valdes
|TKO
|8
|4 December 1956
|align=left| Harringay Arena, Harringay, London
|align=left|
|-
|Win
|
|align=left| Ezzard Charles
|DQ
|2
|2 October 1956
|align=left| Harringay Arena, Harringay, London
|align=left|
|-
|Win
|
|align=left| Kurt Schiegl
|TKO
|1
|16 July 1956
|align=left| Maindy Stadium, Cardiff
|align=left|
|-
|Win
|
|align=left| Guenter Nurnberg
|TKO
|3
|7 July 1956
|align=left| Park Avenue Field, Aberystwyth
|align=left|
|-
|Loss
|
|align=left| Joe Erskine
|PTS
|10
|7 May 1956
|align=left| Maindy Stadium, Cardiff
|align=left|
|-
|Win
|
|align=left| Marcel Limage
|RTD
|5
|27 February 1956
|align=left| Cardiff
|align=left|
|-
|Win
|
|align=left| Werner Wiegand
|TKO
|6
|17 January 1956
|align=left| Streatham Ice Arena, Streatham, London, England
|align=left|
|-
|Win
|
|align=left| Alain Cherville
|KO
|2
|6 December 1955
|align=left| Harringay Arena, Harringay, London
|align=left|
|-
|Win
|
|align=left| Robert Warmbrunn
|TKO
|1
|7 November 1955
|align=left| Abergavenny Market Hall, Abergavenny
|align=left|
|-
|Win
|
|align=left| Robert Eugene
|KO
|4
|18 October 1955
|align=left| Harringay Arena, Harringay, London
|align=left|
|-
|Win
|
|align=left| Emile DeGreef
|KO
|2
|26 September 1955
|align=left| Carmarthen Drill Hall, Carmarthen
|align=left|
|-
|Win
|
|align=left| Peter Bates
|TKO
|3
|13 September 1955
|align=left| White City Stadium, White City, London
|align=left|
|-
|Win
|
|align=left| Jean Serres
|TKO
|3
|29 August 1955
|align=left| Maindy Stadium, Cardiff
|align=left|
|-
|Win
|
|align=left| Prosper Beck
|PTS
|8
|18 July 1955
|align=left| Maindy Stadium, Cardiff
|align=left|
|-
|Loss
|
|align=left| Hugh Ferns
|DQ
|5
|13 June 1955
|align=left| Maindy Stadium, Cardiff
|align=left|
|-
|Win
|
|align=left| Morrie Bush
|KO
|2
|26 April 1955
|align=left| Harringay Arena, Harringay, London
|align=left|
|-
|Win
|
|align=left| Denny Ball
|TKO
|3
|18 April 1955
|align=left| Maindy Stadium, Cardiff
|align=left|
|-
|Win
|
|align=left| Jim Cooper
|TKO
|2
|15 March 1955
|align=left| Streatham Ice Arena, Streatham, London, England
|align=left|
|-
|Win
|
|align=left| Sid Cain
|TKO
|3
|28 February 1955
|align=left| Sophia Gardens, Cardiff
|align=left|
|-
|Win
|
|align=left| Johnny McLeavy
|TKO
|4
|24 January 1955
|align=left| Manor Place Baths, Walworth, London
|align=left|
|-
|Win
|
|align=left| Sammy Clarke
|KO
|1
|10 January 1955
|align=left| Maindy Stadium, Cardiff
|align=left|
|-
|Win
|
|align=left| Johnny Hall
|PTS
|6
|29 November 1954
|align=left| Sophia Gardens, Cardiff
|align=left|
|-
|Draw
|
|align=left| Bernie Jelley
|PTS
|6
|12 October 1954
|align=left| Royal Albert Hall, Kensington, London
|align=left|
|-
|Win
|
|align=left|Peter Green
|KO
|1
|4 October 1954
|align=left| Maindy Stadium, Cardiff
|align=left|
|-
|Win
|
|align=left| Jim Cooper
|PTS
|6
|14 September 1954
|align=left| Harringay Arena, Harringay, London
|align=left|
|}

Sources & external links
 Obituary: http://findarticles.com/p/articles/mi_qn4158/is_19990716/ai_n14258636
 Obit from the Guardian

References

1934 births
1999 deaths
Welsh male boxers
Heavyweight boxers
Royal Army Service Corps soldiers
Sportspeople from Newport, Wales
Deaths from cancer in England
European Boxing Union champions
20th-century British Army personnel